The Kvalsund Bridge is a suspension bridge in Hammerfest Municipality, Troms og Finnmark county, Norway. The bridge crosses the Kvalsundet strait between the mainland and the island of Kvaløya.

Opened for traffic in 1977, the  bridge has 11 spans, the main span being . The Kvalsund Bridge is the 56th longest suspension bridge in the world, and also the northernmost suspension bridge in the world.

Media gallery

References

External links

Road bridges in Troms og Finnmark
Bridges completed in 1977
Former toll bridges in Norway
Suspension bridges in Norway
1977 establishments in Norway
Hammerfest